Roderick McCulloch McKenzie (16 September 1909 – 24 March 2000) was a New Zealand rugby union player. He played 35 matches for the All Blacks—three of which were as captain— including nine internationals.

During World War II, McKenzie served with the New Zealand Tank Brigade, and played in services rugby matches in the United Kingdom for New Zealand Services and Combined Dominions, and twice turned out for Scotland in services internationals.

McKenzie died in Auckland on 24 March 2000, and was buried at Kelvin Grove Cemetery in Palmerston North.

References

1909 births
2000 deaths
New Zealand rugby union players
New Zealand international rugby union players
Manawhenua rugby union players
Manawatu rugby union players
Rugby union flankers
Rugby union locks
New Zealand military personnel of World War II
Burials at Kelvin Grove Cemetery
Rugby union players from Canterbury, New Zealand